Alexander Vladimirovich Slastin (born 12 June 1942) is a Soviet and Russian actor.

History
Alexander Slastin was born on 12 June 1942 in Ulan-Ude in the USSR. After the war ended, his family moved to Ukraine, where he had to undergo an awful famine.

Before Slastin started acting in movies, he worked from 1961 as a trained actor in many theatre groups in the Soviet Union. In 1968, Slastin became a member of the Leningrad Music Hall. In 1969, he made his screen debut playing Prince Galitsky in the opera Prince Igor.

At the beginning of Slastin's acting career, he worked in many Russian film productions. From the beginning of the 1990s, he got jobs for other language areas. His first non-Russian film was the 1991 German TV film Die junge Katharina. He also starred in the Italian film Lo conosciuto.

The most well-known film that Slastin worked in is the 2004 film Downfall, in which he played Soviet general Vasily Chuikov.

In 2005, he earned the honorary title of the Merited Artist of the Russian Federation.

As of now, Slastin lives in Saint Petersburg.

Filmography

References

External links 
 

1942 births
Russian male film actors
Russian male stage actors
People from Ulan-Ude
Living people
Soviet male film actors
Male actors from Saint Petersburg
Soviet male stage actors